Josh Mandel (born October 9, 1958) is an American video game writer, designer, voice actor, and producer. He worked on computer games such as King's Quest V, The Dagger of Amon Ra, Freddy Pharkas: Frontier Pharmacist, Space Quest 6, and Callahan's Crosstime Saloon.

Sierra Entertainment 

Josh Mandel joined Sierra Entertainment in 1990. He was the first person to play the voice of King Graham, the hero of the King's Quest series. He also played Shamir Shamazel in King's Quest VI, Steve Dorian in The Dagger of Amon Ra, and numerous other minor roles.

In 2001, Mandel reprised the role of King Graham for the unofficial fan-made remakes King's Quest I, King's Quest II: Romancing the Stones, and King's Quest III Redux by AGD Interactive and King's Quest III by Infamous Adventures.

Post Sierra 

From 2012 to 2013, Mandel was employed with Replay Games where he, in cooperation with Sierra veteran Al Lowe, worked as a designer and writer on Leisure Suit Larry: Reloaded and Fester Mudd: Curse of the Gold. He quit the company some time after the release of Reloaded.

In January 2014, he contributed to the independent adventure game, Serena, wherein he voices the game's protagonist.

In February 2016, Mandel began working for another Sierra veteran, Corey Cole on Hero-U, a new adventure roleplaying game.

Games

References

External links
Josh Mandel at MobyGames
Josh Mandel at IMDb
Josh Mandel's personal website

1958 births
American male video game actors
American video game designers
American video game producers
Living people
People from Queens, New York
Sierra On-Line employees
Video game writers